Daphne Arden (married name Slater; born 29 December 1941) is a British athlete who competed mainly in the 100 metres.

Personal life
Daphne Arden was born in Birkenhead. She was educated at Moseley Secondary Modern School in Birmingham.

Athletics career
She competed for Great Britain in the 1964 Summer Olympics held in Tokyo, Japan in the 200 metres, finishing 8th in the final; and in the 4 x 100 metres, where she won the bronze medal with her team mates Janet Simpson, long jump gold medallist Mary Rand and Dorothy Hyman.

She represented England and won a silver medal in the 4 × 110 yards relay at the 1962 British Empire and Commonwealth Games in Perth, Western Australia. She repeated the achievement fours years later by winning another silver at the 1966 British Empire and Commonwealth Games in Kingston, Jamaica.

Notes

References
 

1941 births
Living people
English female sprinters
Olympic bronze medallists for Great Britain
Athletes (track and field) at the 1964 Summer Olympics
Olympic athletes of Great Britain
Commonwealth Games medallists in athletics
European Athletics Championships medalists
Medalists at the 1964 Summer Olympics
Athletes (track and field) at the 1962 British Empire and Commonwealth Games
Athletes (track and field) at the 1966 British Empire and Commonwealth Games
Olympic bronze medalists in athletics (track and field)
Commonwealth Games silver medallists for England
Olympic female sprinters
Medallists at the 1962 British Empire and Commonwealth Games